Melancholy, original title Melancholia I, is a 1995 novel by the Norwegian writer Jon Fosse. It is about the Norwegian painter Lars Hertervig (1830–1902) and his time as a young student in Düsseldorf, where he, agonised by unrequited love and doubt in his art, is driven toward a mental breakdown.

The book was awarded the Melsom Prize and the Sunnmøre Prize. It was followed by a 1996 sequel, Melancholy II, which is set on the day of Hertervig's death. The first part of Melancholy I was the basis for Georg Friedrich Haas' 2008 opera Melancholia.

Reception
Publishers Weekly wrote in 2006: "In this wild stream-of-consciousness narrative, Fosse delves into Hertervig's mind as the events of one day precipitate his mental breakdown. ... Fosse's prose, which often affects a childlike quality, might put off some readers, but many gorgeous passages and Fosse's pursuit of the 'glimmer of the divine' in art make this a powerful book."

References

External links
 Publicity page at the Norwegian publisher's website 
 Publicity page at the American publisher's website

1995 novels
20th-century Norwegian novels
Norwegian-language novels
Novels about artists
Novels adapted into operas
Novels by Jon Fosse
Novels set in Germany
Novels set in the 19th century
Works about painters